The official world records in the 3000 metres steeplechase are held by Saif Saaeed Shaheen of Qatar at 7:53.63 minutes for men and Beatrice Chepkoech of Kenya at 8:44.32 for women.

Although the event had been run for decades and was first contested at the 1920 Olympics, the event was not standardized until 1954, with a requirement for athletes to jump a total of 28 barriers of height 91.1 cm to 91.7 cm, and width 3.66 m (4 hurdle barriers per lap), and jump seven water barriers 3.66 m long and wide with a 91 cm hurdle (1 water barrier per lap).  The first 3000 m steeplechase world record to be ratified by the International Association of Athletics Federations (IAAF) was a run of 8:49.6 minutes by Hungarian Sándor Rozsnyói in 1954.

Before standardization, Sweden's Josef Ternström was the first to complete the event in under ten minutes with his time of 9:49.8 minutes in 1914. When he did it, one of the barriers included a stone wall, and the 500-metre course was a figure-eight. Another Swede, Erik Elmsäter, was the first to dip under nine minutes, in 1944. The first person to run the steeplechase in under eight minutes was Moses Kiptanui of Kenya, who ran it in 7:59.18 on 16 August 1995, in Zürich, Switzerland.

The women's 3000 m steeplechase was recognized as an official world record event , recognizing Yelena Motalova's time of 9:48.88 from 1999 as the inaugural record. It was first contested at a World Championships in Athletics in 2005 and made its Olympic debut in 2008. The first sub-10 minute steeplechase was achieved by Romania's Daniela Petrescu in 1998 with a time of 9:55.28 minutes, but this was before the event was recognized by the IAAF. The first sub-nine minute steeplechase for women was by Gulnara Galkina of Russia in 2008 with a clocking of 8:58.81.

On 16 August 2002, Brahim Boulami of Morocco ran 7:53.17 but the performance was not ratified as a record as Boulami tested positive for EPO, a banned substance.

Men

Auto times to the hundredth of a second were accepted by the IAAF for events up to and including 10,000 m from 1981.

 
 Until 2002 Saif Saaeed Shaheen was known as Stephen Cherono, and represented Kenya.

Women

Pre-IAAF recognition

IAAF ratified

References

External links
3000m Steeplechase All Time List from the IAAF

3000 steeple
Steeplechase (athletics)